Events from the year 1826 in Sweden

Incumbents
 Monarch – Charles XIV John

Events

 - Barnängens manufaktur is closed in Stockholm.

Births
 19 January - Rudolf Wall, publisher and journalist  (died 1893)
 15 February - Edvard Swartz, stage actor (died 1897) 
 18 February – Lea Ahlborn,  metallist (died 1897)
 5 June - Ivar Hallström, composer  (died 1901) 
 19 July - Elsa Borg, educator and social worker (died 1909)
 26 August – Johan Fredrik Höckert, artist  (died 1866)
 2 September – Augusta Dorothea Eklund, street peddler and eccentric (died 1895) 
 16 October - Mathilda Ebeling, soprano (died 1851) 
 11 November – Elise Arnberg, miniaturist and photographer (died 1891) 
 Wilhelmina Lagerholm, photographer  (died 1917)

Deaths
 14 March – Julie Alix de la Fay ballerina (born 1746)
 6 May - Sophie Hagman, ballerina and royal mistress  (born 1758)
 19 June - Elsa Fougt, chief editor  (born 1754)
 17 November – Caroline Müller, opera singer (born 1755)
 - Caroline Lewenhaupt, courtier and writer  (born 1754)
 - Maria Aurora Uggla, royal favorite  (born 1747)

References

 
Years of the 19th century in Sweden
Sweden